Kyrylo Nesterenko (born 1 March 1992) is a retired professional Ukrainian football midfielder and current manager.

Career
Nesterenko is product of youth team systems of FC Metalurh Donetsk. He made his debut for FC Metalurh played in the second time substitution in the game against FC Chornomorets Odesa on 4 November 2012 in the Ukrainian Premier League.

References

External links

1992 births
Living people
Sportspeople from Makiivka
Ukrainian footballers
FC Metalurh Donetsk players
Ukrainian Premier League players
FC Šiauliai players
Association football midfielders
Ukrainian expatriate footballers
Expatriate footballers in Lithuania
Ukrainian expatriate sportspeople in Lithuania
Ukrainian football managers
FC Stal Kamianske managers
Ukrainian Premier League managers